Grevillea microstegia, commonly known as Mount Cassell grevillea, is a species of flowering plant in the family Proteaceae and is endemic to Victoria in Australia. It is a prostrate to low-lying or straggling shrub with deeply divided leaves, the end lobes triangular, and toothbrush-shaped clusters of reddish-brown flowers with a red style.

Description
The end lobes or teeth are usually sharply pointed and the edges of the leaves curve downwards.

Taxonomy
Grevillea microstegia was first formally described in 1975 by Bill Molyneux in the journal Muelleria from specimens collected in 1970 on Mount Cassel in the central eastern ranges of the Grampians National Park. The specific epithet (microstegia) refers to the small floral bracts.

Distribution and habitat
Mount Cassell grevillea grows on sandy or rocky soil in forest and scrub in the William Range area of the Grampians National Park.

Conservation status
This species is listed as "threatened" in Victoria under the Flora and Fauna Guarantee Act 1988 and "Vulnerable in Victoria" on the Department of Sustainability and Environment's Advisory List of Rare Or Threatened Plants In Victoria.

References

microstegia
Flora of Victoria (Australia)
Proteales of Australia
Grampians (national park)
Plants described in 1975